2,4-Dinitroaniline is a chemical compound with a formula of C6H5N3O4. It is used as an explosive and as a reagent to detect and characterize aldehydes and ketones.

Preparation 
2,4-Dinitroaniline can be prepared by reaction of 1-chloro-2,4-dinitrobenzene with ammonia. 

It can be also prepared by the electrophilic aromatic substitution of aniline. Direct nitration should not be used due to the reactivity of aniline. (i.e. It can be protonated to anilinium or oxidized easily.) Instead the acetyl protection should be used.

Basicity 
Compared to aniline, the basicity of 2,4-dinitroaniline is even weaker. It is due to the electron-withdrawing nature of the nitro groups. This makes the pKa of conjugate acid of 2,4-dinitroaniline being even lower than that of hydronium ions, meaning that it is a strong acid.

C6H3(NH3+)(NO2)2 + H2O -> C6H3(NH2)(NO2)2 + H3O+

The protons in the amino group is also much more acidic than that of aniline.

Uses 
2,4-Dinitroaniline is usually used as an explosive, although the material possess a negative oxygen balance and can be improved by combining it with an oxidizer such as ammonium nitrate. When in pure form, 2,4-Dinitroaniline has a VoD of 4,800 m/s at 1.61 g/cm3 molecular density.

It is also used for the manufacture of certain azo dyes and disperse dyes, as well as in printing ink, toner, and the preparation of preservatives. The compound also finds applications as an intermediate in the synthesis of neutral dyes, sulfur dyes, and organic pigments.

Safety 
2,4-Dinitroaniline is moderately toxic, with a lethal dose of 285 mg/kg. However, the main danger is that it is explosive and flammable with heat or friction encouraging these properties.

See also 
 2,4,6-Trinitroaniline
 4-Nitroaniline

References 
Calculated from the detonation velocity of 2,4,6-trinitroaniline by multiplying 2/3 

Nitro compounds
anilines